Apoptosis-inducing factor 2 (AIFM2), also known as apoptosis-inducing factor-homologous mitochondrion-associated inducer of death (AMID), is a protein that in humans is encoded by the AIFM2 gene, also known as p53-responsive gene 3 (PRG3), on chromosome 10.

This gene encodes a flavoprotein oxidoreductase that binds single stranded DNA and is thought to contribute to apoptosis in the presence of bacterial and viral DNA. The expression of this gene is also found to be induced by tumor suppressor protein p53 in colon cancer cells.

Function 

The protein encoded by this gene has significant homology to NADH oxidoreductases and the apoptosis-inducing factor PDCD8/AIF. Overexpression of this gene has been shown to induce apoptosis. The expression of this gene is found to be induced by tumor suppressor protein p53 in colon cancer cells.

Structure 

AIFM2 can be found only both in prokaryotes and eukaryotes. Sequence analysis reveals that the AIFM2 gene promoter contains a consensus transcription initiator sequence instead of a TATA box. Though AIFM2 also lacks a recognizable mitochondrial localization sequence and cannot enter the mitochondria, it is found to adhere to the outer mitochondrial membrane (OMM), where it forms a ring-like structure. Two deletion mutations at the N-terminal (aa 1–185 and 1–300) result in nuclear localization and failure to effect cell death, suggesting that AIFM2 must be associated with the mitochondria in order to induce apoptosis. Moreover, domain mapping experiments reveal that only the C-terminal 187 aa is required for apoptotic induction. Meanwhile, mutations in the N-terminal putative FAD- and ADP-binding domains, which are responsible for its oxidoreductase function, do not affect its apoptotic function, thus indicating that these two functions operate independently. It assembles stoichiometrically and noncovalently with 6-hydroxy-FAD.

The AIFM2 gene contains a putative p53-binding element in intron 5, suggesting that its gene expression can be activated by p53.

Function 

This protein is a flavoprotein that functions as an NAD(P)H-dependent oxidoreductase and induces caspase- and p53-independent apoptosis. The exact mechanisms remain unknown, but AIFM2 is found to localize to the cytosol and the OMM. Thus, it may carry out this function by disrupting mitochondrial morphology and releasing proapoptotic factors. Also, under conditions of stress which activate p53-mediated apoptosis, such as hypoxia, AIMF2 may stabilize p53 by inhibiting its degradation and accelerate the apoptotic process. Under normal conditions (i.e., undetectable p53 expression), the AIMF2 gene is highly expressed in the heart, followed by liver and skeletal muscle, with low levels detected in the placenta, lung, kidney, and pancreas and the lowest in the brain. However, in organs such as the heart, there may be additional regulatory mechanisms to suppress its proapoptotic function. For instance, AIFM2 may be able to directly bind nuclear DNA and effect chromatin condensation, as with AIF. Furthermore, AIMF2 expressed at low levels may function as an oxidoreductase involved in metabolism. Hence, under normal cellular conditions, AIFM2 may promote cell survival rather than death by metabolic processes such as generating reactive oxygen species (ROS) to maintain survival signaling.

Clinical significance

AIFM2 has been implicated in tumorigenesis as a p53-inducible gene. AIFM2 mRNA levels are observed to be downregulated in many human cancer tissues, though a previous study reported that AIFM2 mRNA transcripts were only detected in colon cancer and B-cell lymphoma cell lines. Furthermore, its DNA-binding ability contributes to its involvement in the apoptosis-inducing response to viral and bacterial infections, possibly through its role in ROS regulation.

Evolution 
The phylogenetic studies indicates that the divergence of the AIFM1 and other AIFs occurred before the divergence of eukaryotes.

Interactions 

AIFM2 is shown to interact with p53.

AIFM2 is not inhibited by Bcl-2.

AIFM2 can also bind the following coenzymes:
6-hydroxy-FAD,
Flavin adenine dinucleotide (FAD),
NADPH/NADP+, 
NADH/NAD+, and
pyridine nucleotide coenzyme.

References

External links

Further reading 

 
 
 
 
 

Proteins